Ab van Egmond (born 25 August 1938) was a Dutch road cyclist who was active between 1956 and 1963. He won the Olympia's Tour in 1958.

References

1938 births
Living people
Dutch male cyclists
Cyclists from The Hague